{{Infobox person
|image =
|imagesize =
| name        = Tamer Yiğit
| caption            = Tamer Yiğit in 2019
| birth_date         = 
| birth_place        = Balıkesir, Turkey 
| nationality        = Turkish
| education           = İzmir Ticari İlimler Akademisi (Izmir Academy of Commercial Sciences)
| occupation         = Actor, model
| years_active= 1961- present (acting)
| notable_works      = Kuruluş: Osman
| spouse             = 
| children           = 3
| website            = 
}}

Tamer Yiğit (born Tamer Özyiğitoğlu in 1942 in Balıkesir) is a Turkish actor. He starred as Ertuğrul Gazi in the history based and adventure series Kuruluş: Osman (2019). Throughout his acting career Yiğit has been a recipient of numerous accolades.

Early life
Tamer Yiğit studied at the İzmir Ticari İlimler Akademisi. In 1962, he was chosen as the cover star for the "Ses" magazine and began his acting career. He went on to act  in over 150 films including Toprak Ana, Maskeli Beşler,  Suçlular Aramızda, Çalınan Aşk, Kızgın Toprak and Gönül Dostları''.

Personal life
In 1973, he married Rukiye Bayrak and has three children from her. In 1979, he started a business.

Filmography 

 Çukur - 2021/Bölum 39
 Kuruluş: Osman -  2020/Bölüm 28-39
 Kurtlar Vadisi Pusu - 2007-2008/ Bölüm 1-26
 Satıcı - 1999
 Nilgün (2) - 1999
 Nilgün - 1999
 Dünya Kadınla Güzel - 1996
 Çiçek Taksi - 1995
 Acı Zafer - 1994 
 Mümin ile Kafir - 1992
 Yuva - 1990
 Gönül Dostları - 1987
 Aşkın Kanunu - 1978 
 Ölüm Yarışı (film, 1978) - 1978
 Cemal - 1977
 Hedefteki Adam - 1977
 Kaçaklar - 1977
 Yaşamak Güzel Şey - 1977
 Zehirli Çiçek - 1977
 Çifte Nikah - 1977
 Vur Gözünün Üstüne - 1977
 Tilki Payı - 1976
 Gurbetçiler Dönüyor - 1976
 Günahkar - 1976
 Kader Utansın - 1976
 Kanunun Kuvveti - 1976
 Kaybolan Saadet - 1976
 Korkunç Şüphe - 1976
 Tepedeki Ev - 1976
 Atmaca Ali - 1976
 Cezanı Çekeceksin - 1976
 Horoz Gibi Maşallah - 1975
 Anasının Kızı - 1975
 Dur Geliyorum - 1975
 Erkeğim Benim - 1975
 Aklın Durur - 1975
 Fıstıklar - 1975
 Halime'nin Kızları - 1975
 Randevu - 1975
 Sıra Sende Yosma - 1975
 Vur Tatlım - 1975
 Bekaret Kemeri - 1975
 Pusu - 1974 
 Kalleş - 1974
 Zindan - 1974 
 Palavracılar - 1974 
 Şehitler – 1974
 Yılan Yuvası - 1974 
 Fedai - 1974 
 Gel Gardaş Gel - 1974 
 Namus Belası - 1974 
 Reşo / Vatan İçin - 1974
 Azap - 1973 
 Kızgın Toprak - 1973 
 Patron - 1973
 Harman Sonu - 1973 
 Irgat - 1973 
 Kurt Kapanı - 1973 
 Tuzak - 1973 
 Yabancı - 1973 
 Kara Toprak - 1973 
 Toprak Ana - 1973 
 Acı Sevda - 1972 
 Şehvet - 1972 
 Tehlikeli Görev - 1972 
 Vahşi Aşk - 1972 
 Hacı Murat'ın İntikamı - 1972 
 Kalleşler - 1972 
 Ya Sev Ya Öldür - 1972 
 Aşka Selam Kavgaya Devam - 1972 
 Bela Mustafa - 1972 
 Fırtına Kemal - 1972
 Vur Gardaş Vur - 1972
 Yıldırım Ajan - 1972 
 Merhaba Tatlım - 1972 
 Dadaloğlu'nun İntikamı - 1972 
 Kin Silah ve Namus - 1971 
 Kızgın Yabancı - 1971 
 Kazanova Niyazi - 1971 
 Batakhaneler Kralı - 1971 
 Beş Hergele - 1971
 Bilardo Kazım - 1971 
 Çamur Şevket - 1971
 Dadaloğlu - 1971 
 Ölümünü Kendin Seç - 1971 
 Bir Çuval Para - 1970
 Ecel Teri - 1970 
 Acımak - 1970 
 İste Kölen Olayım - 1970 
 Yazı mı Tura mı - 1970 
 Kanun Kaçakları - 1970 
 Ölüme Giden Yol - 1969 
 Sabırtaşı - 1969 
 Ebu Müslim Horasani - 1969 
 Günahını Ödeyen Kadın - 1969 
 Kaderden Kaçılmaz - 1969 
 Kardeş Kanı - 1969 
 Ölüm Şart Oldu - 1969 
 Ringo Vadiler Kaplanı - 1969 
 Sazlı Damın Kahpesi - 1969
 Yaşamak Hakkımdır - 1969 
 Zorro'nun İntikamı - 1969 
 Sevdalı Gelin - 1969 
 Kınalı Keklik - 1969 
 Zorro Kamçılı Süvari - 1969 
 Menderes Köprüsü - 1968 
 Hakanlar Savaşı - 1968 
 Gelincik Tarlası - 1968 
 Ölümsüz Adam - 1968 
 Kara Güneş - 1968 
 Belalı Beşler - 1968 
 Derebeyi - 1968 
 Kara Pençe - 1968 
 Kışlalar Doldu Bugün - 1968 
 Maskeli Beşlerin Dönüşü - 1968
 Maskeli Beşler - 1968
 Üvey Ana - 1967 
 Dördü de Seviyordu - 1967 
 Gül Ağacı - 1967 
 Akbulut, Malkoçoğlu Ve Karaoğlan'a Karşı - 1967
 Sen Benimsin - 1967 
 Erkek Adam Sözünde Durur - 1967 
 Zehirli Dudaklar - 1967 
 Anjelik Osmanlı Saraylarında - 1967
 Namus Belası - 1967 
 Aslan Yürekli Reşat - 1967 
 Boğaziçi Şarkısı - 1966 
 Biraz Kül Biraz Duman - 1966 
 Zehirli Kucak - 1966 
 Yosma - 1966 
 Aşkın Kanunu 1966 
 Yiğitler Ölmezmiş - 1966 
 Anadolu Kanunu - 1966 
 Fırtına Beşler - 1966 
 Milyonerin Kızı / İntikam Hırsı - 1966 
 Kalpsiz - 1966 
 Garip Bir İzdivaç - 1965 
 Aramızdaki Düşman - 1965 
 Dağ Çiçeği - 1965 
 Fırıldak Naci - 1965 
 Korkunç İntikam - 1965 
 Sokaklar Yanıyor - 1965 
 Seveceksen Yiğit Sev - 1965 
 Şekerli misin Vay Vay - 1965 
 Melek Yüzlü Caniler - 1965 
 Ölüm Çemberi - 1965 
 Kalbimdeki Serseri - 1965 
 Zennube - 1965 
 Kanlı Meydan - 1965 
 Babamız Evleniyor - 1965 
 Suçlular Aramızda - 1964
 On Korkusuz Adam - 1964 
 Bana Derler Külhanlı - 1964 
 Hepimiz Kardeşiz - 1964
 Kalbe Vuran Düşman - 1964 
 Son Tren - 1964 
 Ve Allah Gençleri Yarattı - 1964 
 Hayat Kavgası - 1964 
 Dağlar Bizimdir - 1964 
 Fedakar Öğretmen - 1964 
 Günahsız Katiller - 1964 
 Satılık Kızlar - 1964 
 Meyhaneci / Can Düşmanı - 1964 
 Çalınan Aşk - 1963
 Bire On Vardı - 1963 
 Çapkın Kız - 1963 
 Sayın Bayan - 1963 
 Kendini Arayan Adam - 1963 
 Aşk Tomurcukları - 1963 
 Yakılacak Kitap – 1963
 Daima Kalbimdesin - 1962
 Atlı Yiğit - 1961

References

External links

1942 births
People from Balıkesir
Turkish male film actors
Living people